Crosbyana is a compilation album of phonograph records by Bing Crosby  released in 1941 featuring songs that were sung in some of Crosby's motion pictures such as Mississippi, Here is My Heart, and The Big Broadcast of 1936.

Track listing
These previously issued songs were featured on a 6-disc, 78 rpm album set, Decca Album DA-221.

References

Bing Crosby compilation albums
1941 compilation albums
Decca Records compilation albums